Jan Štěrba (born 8 July 1994) is a Czech football player, who currently plays as a centre-back for Zbrojovka Brno.

External links
 Profile at FC Zbrojovka Brno
 

1994 births
Living people
Czech footballers
SK Sigma Olomouc players
FC Zbrojovka Brno players
Association football central defenders
Czech National Football League players
MFK Karviná players
Sportspeople from Ostrava